Dale Caterson (born 19 July 1961) is an Australian former national champion, World Champion, Olympian and Commonwealth Games gold medal winning rowing coxswain. He is Australia's first World Champion coxswain, having steered the 1986 World Championship men's eight to victory.

Club and state rowing
He was born in Sydney and his senior rowing was with the Sydney Rowing Club.

Caterson was first selected to steer a New South Wales state crew in the 1983 men's Interstate Eight-Oared Championship racing for the King's Cup. He again coxed New South Wales King's Cup eights in 1984 (to victory), 1985, 1987, 1990 and 1991.

He steered Mosman and composite coxed fours in national title attempts at the Australian Rowing Championships in 1983, 1985 (to victory), 1987 and 1988.

International representative rowing
Caterson's first World Championship national representation was in the men's lightweight eight at the 1984 World Rowing Championships in Montreal, a lightweight only regatta being an Olympic year. The following year at Hazewinkel 1985 he coxed the Australian heavyweight men's eight who placed ninth.

At the 1986 World Rowing Championships in Nottingham, England, Caterson steered the Australian men's eight to a gold medal. It was Australia's first and only World Championship title in the men's heavyweight eight and Caterson became the first coxswain to steer an Australian coxed boat to a world title. That same year at the 1986 Commonwealth Games in Edinburgh, that same crew with Caterson in the stern also won gold in the Australian men's eight. Caterson also steered a coxed four to a bronze medal at those same games.

At the 1987 World Rowing Championships in Copenhagen Caterson coxed the Australian eight to a fourth place and he held his role in the men's eight for the 1988 Summer Olympics in Seoul. That crew placed fifth. He took a break after the Olympics but was back on the water at state and national level in 1990. His final national representative coxing duties were in the Australian men's eight at both the 1990 and 1991 World Rowing Championships.

References

External links
 

1961 births
Sportsmen from New South Wales
Rowers from Sydney
Australian male rowers
Rowers at the 1988 Summer Olympics
Living people
World Rowing Championships medalists for Australia
Commonwealth Games medallists in rowing
Commonwealth Games gold medallists for Australia
Coxswains (rowing)
Rowers at the 1986 Commonwealth Games
Olympic rowers of Australia
20th-century Australian people
Medallists at the 1986 Commonwealth Games